Robert Henderson (3 May 1851 – 22 September 1895) was an English first-class cricketer active 1872–78 who played for Middlesex. He was born in Fulham; died in Horsham. He was educated at Harrow School.

References

1851 births
1895 deaths
English cricketers
Middlesex cricketers
Non-international England cricketers
Gentlemen of England cricketers
I Zingari cricketers
People educated at Harrow School